John Locke (February 14, 1764 – March 29, 1855), was a U.S. Representative from Massachusetts.

Early life, education, and career
Locke was born in Hopkinton in the Massachusetts Bay Colony. He attended Andover Academy and Dartmouth College, eventually graduating from Harvard University in 1792.  He was admitted to the Massachusetts bar and began practicing law in Ashby in 1796.

Political career
Locke was a member of the Massachusetts House of Representatives in 1804, 1805, 1813, and 1823. He was a delegate to the state constitutional convention in 1820. He was elected to the Eighteenth, Nineteenth, and Twentieth U.S. Congress, serving March 4, 1823 to March 3, 1829. He declined to be a candidate for renomination in 1828.  Locke was a member of the Massachusetts State Senate in 1830, and of the state executive council in 1831.  At this time he also resumed the practice of law.

Writing
He wrote two "essays" about how the Articles of Confederation were wrong, and was ridiculed greatly by peers.

Personal life and
Locke married Hannah Goodwin. Locke died in Boston, Massachusetts on March 29, 1855; he is interred in Lowell Cemetery in Lowell.

References 

1764 births
1855 deaths
Massachusetts state senators
Members of the Massachusetts House of Representatives
Harvard University alumni
Dartmouth College alumni
People from Hopkinton, Massachusetts
Massachusetts National Republicans
19th-century American politicians
Democratic-Republican Party members of the United States House of Representatives from Massachusetts
National Republican Party members of the United States House of Representatives